Pinin is a protein that in humans is encoded by the PNN gene.

Interactions
Pinin has been shown to interact with Keratin 8, Keratin 18, Keratin 19, CTBP1, RNPS1, PRPF4B, SFRS4, PPIG, SRRM2 and SFRS18.

References

Further reading